A West Country Ketch or a Tamar Ketch is a two-masted sailing Ketch, designed for carrying cargo from the South West England, predominantly from the ports of the River Tamar, to ports on the Celtic Sea, such as Cork.

The West Country Ketch is a specialist type of ketch designed for the waters of the Celtic Sea. At the peak of nautical trading within this region there were up to 700 West Country Trading Ketches active, only three such vessels have survived to the modern day. This type of vessel is characterised by having a length between 100 ft - 120 ft, a depth of 10 ft and a beam of 20 ft. This type of vessel has a wide midship section, with a sharp bow and a rounded stern. These vessels can carry 75 - 100 tons in their holds. Its shape was very well suited to trading in the Celtic Sea.

The Tamar ketch is relatively shorter than the West Country Ketch. It is not only suited to trading in the Celtic Sea, but also travelling up rivers. They were usually built on the banks of the River Tamar. The only current Tamar Ketch is the Garlandstone built by James Goss in Calstock.

Surviving West Country ketches

Gallery

See also 

 Tamar Barge
 Ketch

References

External links 

Ship types
Barges
Cargo ships
Sailboat types